Costanza Bonarelli (1614 – 3 December 1662), also known as Costanza Bonucelli or Costanza Piccolomini Bonucelli, was an Italian noblewoman, merchant and art dealer, descended from a Sienese noble family. She is known for being portrayed by the artist Gian Lorenzo Bernini in the bust now exhibited at the National Museum of Bargello in Florence, created between 1636 and 1638.

The Piccolomini family 
Costanza was born around 1614, daughter of Lorenzo Piccolomini, member of a minor branch of the important Sienese family. The first time she appears in documents is in Rome during 1625, when she was eleven years old. The name of her mother is unknown because in this document, coming from the Stati d'Anime of the parish S. Lorenzo in Lucina, Costanza was resident in the street "behind the palace of the church" - the current via della Vite - with her father Leonardo and her step-mother, Tiberia. Costanza never mentioned her mother in her last will, signed around the 23 January 1662. Even if Lorenzo was part of the "poor" branch of the Piccolomini family and he worked as a groom, his name and his association with the powerful clan are still today for the identification of Costanza, that in the documents is always named 'Signora' and,  in the aforementioned testament, she stabilished that her inheritance could have been inherited by all the descendants, as long as their last name was Piccolomini.

The wedding 
On 15 August 1628, on the occasion of Solemnity of the Assumption, Costanza received a dowry of 45 scudi (the equivalent of an annual rent for a house of modest dimension) from the Confraternity of San Rocco, funded by Giambattista Borghese, brother of the late Pope Paolo V. In 1630 Costanza, named as 'la zitella da Viterbo' ("the spinster of Viterbo), received the promise of a second dowry of 26 scudi and 44 baiocchi, this time from the Gonfalone Confraternity.
Costanza then married the sculptor, restorer and art dealer Matteo Bonarelli (or Bonucelli) from Lucca, on 16 February 1632 in his parish of San Lorenzo in Lucina. On the 28th February, the marriage contract is signed between Costanza, her father Leonardo and her husband Matteo. The dowry is fixed at 289 scudi. Costanza was eighteen years old and Matteo twenty-eight: they settled in the current Scanderbeg alley, at the foothills of the Quirinale.

The relationship with Bernini 
The first testimony of Matteo Bonucelli as an assistant of Bernini is the payment, by the year 1636, for three putti of marble for the S. Pietro; the following year, Matteo assisted Bernini with the mausoleum dedicated to Countess Matilde, always in San Pietro. When they first meet, Costanza was a married woman of 22 years old, Gian Lorenzo Bernini a 38-year-old bachelor. The portrait of Bargello, in which the sculptor of cardinals and popes immortalized his lover in marble, may have been started in 1636, but it was definitely finished in October 1637 when Fulvio Testi, a friend of Bernini, in a letter to the Count Francesco Fontana declared that it was the most beautiful portrait executed by the artist. With this last annotation, we can assume that the portrait was partly known to the public.

But in the summer of 1638 the scandal broke. When Gianlorenzo Bernini discovered that Costanza was having an affair with his younger brother Luigi, Gianlorenzo was blinded by jealousy, and his excesses were described by his mother, Angelica Galante Bernini, in a letter destined to the Cardinal Francesco Barberini, dated around autumn 1638. Costanza was punished by a groom of the Bernini family that slashed her face upon request of Bernini himself;  meanwhile Luigi fled from Rome and took refuge in Bologna for about a year. Courtesans were frequently victims of the crime of being slashed in the face, which was described by the late Italian lawyer Prospero Farinacci as "atrox et grave delictum". Costanza was indeed described as a courtesan and punished (perhaps for adultery) with detention in the Domus Pia de Urbe, a place also known as the monastery of Casa Pia, while the groom that injured her was exiled; Gianlorenzo Bernini, instead, was at first condemned to pay a penalty of three thousand scudi, and then pardoned, whilst his brother Luigi, who was less famous and considered less important by the Pope, was also exiled from Rome. It wasn't until 7 April 1639, and only after writing a heartbreaking plea to the Governor of the house, that Costanza was "given back to her husband".

Widow and art dealer 
During the following years Costanza lived in her old house/study in harmony with her husband, moreover she continued the business of merchant and art dealer with a fair success also after the death of Matteo Bonacelli (18 January 1654) and during the pontificate of the Sienese Alessandro VII Chigi. In his will, signed in the year 1649, Matteo designated as sole heir "Signora Costanza Piccolomini mia dilettissima moglie". Payment orders intended for the Bonucelli widow refer to her as "Signora Costanza", or "Costanza Piccolomini" or also "Costanza scultora".

Costanza had a large collection of artworks that was exhibited in the main floor of her house, and in two rooms on the upper floor. One of the most famous works collected by her was the Plague of Ashdod by Nicolas Poussin, commissioned by the Sicilian Nobleman Fabrizio Valguarnera in 1630. In 1665, when Bernini was in Paris, he saw the artwork in the palace of the Duke of Richelieu and he claimed he knew it, suggesting that the painting had to be hung lower to watch it better. In the same year, Richelieu sold the painting (today located in the Louvre) to King Louis XIV of France.

The last years 
During Easter 1657, Costanza Piccolomini became the mother of a child, Olimpia Caterina Piccolomini: the girl must have been born more than a year after the death of Matteo Bonacelli, when Costanza was in her mid-40s. Costanza made her will in February 1659, and three days before her death she added a codicil, on 30 November 1662. Costanza wasn't buried with her husband in the crypt of their parish of St. Vincenzo and Anastasio, but was buried in the church of Santa Maria Maggiore. Just like, respectively 18 and 19 years after her death, Gianlorenzo and Luigi Bernini.

References

Further reading
Sarah McPhee, Bernini's Beloved. A portrait of Costanza Piccolomini, New Haven and London, Yale University Press, 2012.
Domenico Bernini, Franco Mormando, The Life of Gian Lorenzo Bernini, Pennsylvania State University Press, 2011.

Gian Lorenzo Bernini
Costanza
17th-century Italian nobility
17th-century Italian businesswomen
17th-century Italian businesspeople
Italian art dealers
Women art dealers
Italian art collectors
People from Viterbo
1614 births
1662 deaths
Burials at Santa Maria Maggiore
Italian artists' models